"Joker & the Thief" is a song by Australian rock band Wolfmother. The song serves as the sixth track and sixth single from the band's eponymous debut studio album. It was released in Australia on 28 October 2006 and in the United Kingdom on 20 November 2006. The music video for the song was nominated for the "Best Rock Video" and "Video of the Year" awards at the 2007 MTV Australia Awards. The titular "joker" and "thief" are a reference to the lyrics of Bob Dylan's 1967 song "All Along the Watchtower".

In January 2018, as part of Triple M's "Ozzest 100", the 'most Australian' songs of all time, "Joker & the Thief" was ranked number 59.

Content
Singer Andrew Stockdale told an interviewer,

In popular culture
"Joker & the Thief" has been featured in several films, video games and TV shows including The Blacklist, The Hangover, Shoot 'Em Up, NHL 14, Rock Revolution, Jackass Number Two, Impractical Jokers: The Movie, Karaoke Revolution Presents American Idol Encore 2, Here Comes the Boom, MLB 07: The Show, Need for Speed: Carbon, Shrek the Third, Lego DC Super-Villains, Preacher and The Man from Toronto. It is also available as downloadable content for the music video game series Rock Band.

The song appeared in the Green Bay Packers' video package at Super Bowl XLV.

At the Chicago Bears' home games, before kickoff, "Joker & the Thief" would play loudly with a bear and blue lightning graphics coming out of its eyes. The Kansas State Wildcats also regularly play "Joker & the Thief" for introductions for both their football and men’s basketball team, and the song is now a known hit within their fanbase. The University of Louisville Cardinals use the song as a hype song leading into the fourth quarter of football games and ninth inning of baseball. Michigan Technological University also frequently plays this song during hockey games before going onto a power play.  This song is also played before the centre bounce at Brisbane Lions home games.

Track listings
All songs are credited to Wolfmother.

Australian CD single
 "Joker & the Thief"
 "Joker & the Thief" (Loving Hand Remix)
 "Vagabond" (Acoustic Version)
 "Where Eagles Have Been" (Live at Lollapalooza)

UK CD single
 "Joker & the Thief"
 "Joker & the Thief" (Loving Hand Remix)
 "Where Eagles Have Been" (Live at Lollapalooza)

UK DVD single
 "Joker & the Thief" (Audio)
 "Joker & the Thief" (Video)
 "Dimension" (Live at The Scala)
 "Jackass Number Two Trailer"

UK 7-inch vinyl
 "Joker & the Thief"
 "Where Eagles Have Been" (Live at Lollapalooza)

Personnel
 Andrew Stockdale – guitar, vocals
 Chris Ross – bass, keyboard
 Myles Heskett – drums

Charts

Weekly charts

Year-end charts

Certifications

References

2005 songs
2006 singles
Wolfmother songs
Song recordings produced by Dave Sardy